King and Queen County is a county in the U.S. state of Virginia, located in the state's Middle Peninsula on the eastern edge of the Richmond, VA metropolitan area. As of the 2020 census, the population was 6,608. Its county seat is King and Queen Court House.

History 
King and Queen County was established in 1691 from New Kent County. The county is named for King William III and Queen Mary II of England. King and Queen County is notable as one of the few counties in the United States to have recorded a larger population in the 1790 census than in the 2010 one.

Among the earliest settlers of King and Queen County was Roger Shackelford, an English emigrant from Old Alresford, Hampshire, after whom the county's village of Shacklefords is named. Shackelford's descendants continued to live in the county, and by the nineteenth century had intermarried with several local families, including Taliaferro, Beverley, Thornton, and Sears.

In 1762 when he was 11, future president James Madison was sent to a boarding school run by Donald Robertson at the Innes plantation in King and Queen County. Robertson was a Scottish teacher who tutored numerous prominent plantation families in the South. From Robertson, Madison learned mathematics, geography, and modern and classical languages—he became especially proficient in Latin. He attributed his instinct for learning "largely to that man (Robertson)."  At age 16, Madison returned to his father's Montpelier estate in Orange County.

On March 2, 1864, the Battle of Walkerton, an engagement of the American Civil War took place here, resulting in a Confederate victory.

Virginia Longest, national director of Nursing Service for the U.S. Department of Veterans Affairs, was a county native.

Richard and Mildred Loving lived in a remote part of the county, hoping to avoid arrest by the authorities while their legal challenge to Virginia's anti-miscegenation laws moved through the courts.

For many years, county publications noted that the county lacked any traffic lights. This is now no longer the case, as a traffic light has been installed on U.S. Route 360 at St. Stephen's Church.

Even in the 21st century, King and Queen County contains no incorporated towns or cities, and remains one of Virginia's most sparsely-populated counties.

Geography

Measuring 72 miles in length, it is known as the longest county in the state of Virginia. Although it is long in length, it extremely narrow measuring less than 20 miles wide.

Adjacent Counties
 Caroline County – north
 Essex County – northeast
 Middlesex County – east
 Gloucester County – southeast
 James City County – south
 New Kent County – southwest
 King William County – west

Major Highways

Demographics

2020 census

Note: the US Census treats Hispanic/Latino as an ethnic category. This table excludes Latinos from the racial categories and assigns them to a separate category. Hispanics/Latinos can be of any race.

2000 Census
As of the census of 2000, there were 6,630 people, 2,673 households, and 1,897 families residing in the county.  The population density was 21 people per square mile (8/km2).  There were 3,010 housing units at an average density of 10 per square mile (4/km2).  The racial makeup of the county was 61.22% White, 35.67% Black or African American, 1.42% Native American, 0.27% Asian, 0.02% Pacific Islander, 0.15% from other races, and 1.25% from two or more races.  0.87% of the population were Hispanic or Latino of any race.

There were 2,673 households, out of which 26.80% had children under the age of 18 living with them, 52.60% were married couples living together, 13.50% had a female householder with no husband present, and 29.00% were non-families. 24.60% of all households were made up of individuals, and 11.00% had someone living alone who was 65 years of age or older.  The average household size was 2.48 and the average family size was 2.94.

In the county, the population was spread out, with 22.70% under the age of 18, 7.00% from 18 to 24, 26.80% from 25 to 44, 27.00% from 45 to 64, and 16.40% who were 65 years of age or older.  The median age was 41 years. For every 100 females there were 95.20 males.  For every 100 females age 18 and over, there were 92.50 males.

The median income for a household in the county was $35,941, and the median income for a family was $40,563. Males had a median income of $33,217 versus $21,753 for females. The per capita income for the county was $17,236.  10.90% of the population and 7.80% of families were below the poverty line.  Out of the total people living in poverty, 8.10% are under the age of 18 and 14.80% are 65 or older.

Government

Board of Supervisors
 Buena Vista District: James M. Burns
 Newtown District: Sherrin C. Alsop (I)
 Shanghai District: R.F. "Rusty" Bailey, Jr. (I)
 St. Stephens Church District: James Lawrence Simpkins (I)
 Stevensville District: Doris H. Morris (I)

Constitutional officers
 Clerk of the Circuit Court: Vanessa D. Porter
 Commissioner of the Revenue: Kelly N. Lumpkin(I)
 Commonwealth's Attorney: Meredith D. Adkins 
 Sheriff: John R. Charboneau
 Treasurer: Irene B. Longest

King and Queen is represented by Republican Thomas K. "Tommy" Norment in the Virginia Senate, Republican M. Keith Hodges in the Virginia House of Delegates, and Republican Robert J. "Rob" Wittman in the U.S. House of Representatives.

Presidentially, King and Queen County is a bellwether county of sorts. It correctly predicted the winner of all but four presidential elections between 1928 and 2020, only voting for losing candidates in 1968, 1980, and 2012, and 2020.

Communities
 King and Queen Court House (a census-designated place)
 Newtown
 St. Stephen's Church
 Shacklefords

See also
 National Register of Historic Places listings in King and Queen County, Virginia

References

 
Virginia counties
1691 establishments in Virginia